The Ministry of Finance (IAST: Vitta Maṃtrālaya) is a ministry within the Government of India concerned with the economy of India, serving as the Treasury of India. In particular, it concerns itself with taxation, financial legislation, financial institutions, capital markets, centre and state finances, and the Union Budget.

The Ministry of Finance is the apex controlling authority of four central civil services namely Indian Revenue Service, Indian Audit and Accounts Service, Indian Economic Service and Indian Civil Accounts Service. It is also the apex controlling authority of one of the central commerce services namely Indian Cost and Management Accounts Service.

History
R. K. Shanmukham Chetty was the first Finance Minister of independent India. He presented the first budget of independent India on 26 November 1947.

Department of Economic Affairs
The Department of Economic Affairs is the nodal agency of the Union Government to formulate and monitor country's economic policies and programmes having a bearing on domestic and international aspects of economic management. A principal responsibility of this department is the preparation and presentation of the Union Budget to the parliament and budget for the state Governments under President's Rule and union territory administrations.  Other main functions include:

 Formulation and monitoring of macroeconomic policies, including issues relating to fiscal policy and public finance, inflation, public debt management and the functioning of Capital Market including Stock Exchanges. In this context, it looks at ways and means to raise internal resources through taxation, market borrowings and mobilisation of small savings;
 Monitoring and raising of external resources through multilateral and bilateral Official Development Assistance, sovereign borrowings abroad, foreign investments and monitoring foreign exchange resources including balance of payments;
 Production of bank notes and coins of various denominations, postal stationery, postal stamps; and Cadre management, career planning and training of the Indian Economic Service (IES).

The Foreign Investment Promotion Board (FIPB), housed in the Department of Economic Affairs, Ministry of Finance, was an inter-ministerial body, responsible for processing of FDI proposals and making recommendations for Government approval. FIPB is now abolished as announced by Finance Minister Arun Jaitley during 2017-2018 budget speech in Lok Sabha.

Shri Ajay Seth is the current secretary of this department.

Department of Expenditure
The Department of Expenditure is the nodal department for overseeing the public financial management system (PFMS) in the Central Government and matters connected with the state finances. The principal activities of the department include a pre-sanction appraisal of major schemes/projects (both Plan and non-Plan expenditure), handling the bulk of the Central budgetary resources transferred to States, implementation of the recommendations of the Finance and Central Pay Commissions, overseeing the expenditure management in the Central Ministries/Departments through the interface with the Financial Advisors and the administration of the Financial Rules / Regulations /Orders through monitoring of Audit comments/observations, preparation of Central Government Accounts, managing the financial aspects of personnel management in the Central Government, assisting Central Ministries/Departments in controlling the costs and prices of public services, assisting organizational re-engineering thorough review of staffing patterns and O&M studies and reviewing systems and procedures to optimize outputs and outcomes of public expenditure. The department is also coordinating matters concerning the Ministry of Finance including Parliament-related work of the Ministry. The department has under its administrative control the National Institute of Financial Management (NIFM), Faridabad.

The business allocated to the Department of Expenditure is carried out through its Establishment Division, Plan Finance I and II Divisions, Finance Commission Division, Staff Inspection Unit, Cost Accounts Branch, Controller General of Accounts, and the Central Pension Accounting.

Dr. T. V. Somanathan is the current secretary of this department.

Department of Revenue
The Department of Revenue function
under the overall direction and control of the Secretary (Revenue). It exercises control in respect of matters relating to all the Direct and Indirect Union Taxes through two statutory Boards namely, the Central Board of Direct Taxes (CBDT) and the Central Board of Indirect Taxes and Customs (CBIC). Each Board is headed by a Chairman who is also ex officio Special Secretary to the Government of India (Secretary level). Matters relating to the levy and collection of all Direct taxes are looked after by the CBDT whereas those relating to levy and collection of GST, Customs Duty, Central Excise duties and other Indirect taxes fall within the purview of the CBIC. The two Boards were constituted under the Central Board of Revenue Act, 1963. At present, the CBDT has six Members and the CBIC has five Members. The Members are also ex officio  Secretaries to the Government of India. Members of CBDT are as follows:

 Member (Income Tax)
 Member (Legislation and Computerisation)
 Member (Revenue)
 Member (Personnel & Vigilance)
 Member (Investigation)
 Member (Audit & Judicial)
Tarun Bajaj is the current secretary of this department, His predecessor was Ajay Bhushan Pandey.

Department of Financial Services
The Department of Financial Services covers Banks, Insurance, and Financial Services provided by various government agencies and private corporations. It also covers pension reforms and Industrial Finance and Micro, Small and Medium Enterprise. It started the Pradhan Mantri Jan Dhan Yojana.

Sanjay Malhotra is the current secretary of this department. 

This department has ownership over the following central government establishments.

Recruitment Bodies
Institute of Banking Personnel Selection (IBPS)

National Apex Bodies
Indian Institute of Banking and Finance (IIBF)
Insurance Institute of India 
Institute of Actuaries of India

Regulatory Bodies

1. Reserve Bank of India (RBI)

2. Securities and Exchange Board of India (SEBI)
Forward Markets Commission (FMC)
National Securities Depository Limited (NSDL)
Central Securities Depository Limited (CSDL)
Association of Mutual Funds of India (AMFI)
3. Insurance Regulatory and Development Authority of India (IRDAI)

4. Pension Fund Regulatory and Development Authority (PFRDAI)
NPS Trust (NPS)

All India Financial Institutions

1. National Bank for Agriculture and Rural Development (NABARD)

2. National Housing Bank (NHB)

3. Small Industries Development Bank of India (SIDBI)

4. Export Import Bank (EXIM Bank)

5. National Bank for Financing Infrastructure and Development (NaBFID) (Came into force w.e.f. April 19, 2021)

Development Finance Institution

Industrial Development Bank of India (IDBI)
Industrial Finance Corporation of India (IFCI)
Industrial Reconstruction Company of India (IRCI)
Unit Trust of India (UTI) 
India Infrastructure Finance Company Limited (IIFCL)
Agricultural Finance Corporation of India (AFCI)
Industrial and Investment Credit Corporation of India (ICICI) 
Housing Development Finance Corporation (HDFC) 
National Bank Financing Infrastructure and Development
Board for Industrial and Financial Reconstruction
Risk Capital and Technology Finance Corporation Limited
Technology Development and Information Company of India Limited
Discount and Finance House of India Limited

Central Public Sector Undertakings

1. Nationalised Banks

Presently there are 13 nationalised banks in India. 
 State Bank of India 
 Bank of Baroda 
 Union Bank of India 
 Punjab National Bank 
 Canara Bank 
 Punjab & Sind Bank 
 Indian Bank 
 Bank of Maharashtra 
 Bank of India 
 Central Bank of India 
 Indian Overseas Bank 
 UCO Bank 
 Jammu & Kashmir Bank

2. Regional Rural Bank

Presently there are 43 regional rural banks in India since 1 April 2020

Andhra Pradesh

Andhra Pragathi Grameena Bank
Andhra Pradesh Grameena Vikas Bank
Chaitanya Godavari Gramin Bank
Saptagiri Gramin Bank

Arunachal Pradesh	
Arunachal Pradesh Rural Bank

Assam
Assam Gramin Vikash Bank

Bihar
 Dakshin Bihar 
 Gramin Bank
Uttar Bihar Gramin Bank

Chhattisgarh
Chhattisgarh Rajya Gramin Bank

Gujarat
Baroda Gujarat Gramin Bank
Saurashtra Gramin Bank

Haryana
Sarva Haryana Gramin Bank

Himachal Pradesh
Himachal Pradesh Gramin Bank

Jammu and Kashmir
J&K Grameen Bank
Ellaquai Dehati Bank

Jharkhand
Jharkhand Rajya Gramin Bank

Karnataka
Karnataka Gramin Bank 
Karnataka Vikas Grameena Bank

Kerala
Kerala Gramin Bank

Madhya Pradesh
Madhyanchal Gramin Bank
Madhya Pradesh Gramin Bank

Maharashtra
Maharashtra Gramin Bank
Vidharbha Konkan Gramin Bank

Manipur
Manipur Rural Bank

Meghalaya
Meghalaya Rural Bank

Mizoram
Mizoram Rural Bank

Nagaland
Nagaland Rural Bank

Odisha	
Odisha Gramya Bank
Utkal Grameen Bank

Puducherry
Puduvai Bharathiar Grama Bank

Punjab	
Punjab Gramin Bank

Rajasthan	
Baroda Rajasthan Kshetriya Gramin Bank	
Rajasthan Marudhara Gramin Bank

Tamil Nadu
Tamil Nadu Grama Bank

Telangana
Telangana Grameena Bank

Tripura
Tripura Gramin Bank

Uttar Pradesh
Aryavart 
 Bank
Prathama UP 
 Gramin Bank
Baroda UP Bank
Uttarakhand
Uttarakhand Gramin Bank

West Bengal
Paschim Banga Gramin Bank	
Bangiya Gramin Vikash Bank
 Uttarbanga Kshetriya Gramin Bank

3. Nationalised Insurance Companies

Presently there are 07 nationalised insurance companies.
Life Insurance Corporation
General Insurance Corporation of India
New India Assurance
National Insurance Company Limited
Oriental Insurance Company Limited
United India Insurance Company
Agriculture Insurance Company of India

4. Nationalised Financial Market Exchanges

Presently there are 28 nationalised financial market exchanges in India and currently only six are operating

Operational stock exchange
National Stock Exchange of India
Bombay Stock Exchange 
Calcutta Stock Exchange 
 India International Exchange
Metropolitan Stock Exchange

Operational Commodity Exchanges
 Indian Commodity Exchange
Multi Commodity Exchange
National Commodity and Derivatives Exchange
National Spot Exchange
Inter-connected Stock Exchange of India

Defunct stock exchanges
Over the Counter Exchange of India
Hyderabad Stock Exchange 
Coimbatore Stock Exchange 
Saurashtra Kutch Stock Exchange
Mangalore Stock Exchange
Cochin Stock Exchange 
Bangalore Stock Exchange
Ludhiana Stock Exchange 
Guwahati Stock Exchange 
Bhubaneswar Stock Exchange 
Jaipur Stock Exchange
Pune Stock Exchange
Madras Stock Exchange 
Uttar Pradesh Stock Exchange
Madhya Pradesh Stock Exchange 
Vadodara Stock Exchange
Delhi Stock Exchange 
Ahmedabad Stock Exchange

Department of Investment and Public Asset Management

The Department of Disinvestment has been renamed as Department of Investment and Public Asset Management or 'DIPAM', a decision aimed at the proper management of Centre's investments in equity including its disinvestment in central public sector undertakings. Finance Minister Arun Jaitley had announced the renaming of the Department of Disinvestment in his budget speech for 2016-17. Initially set up as an independent ministry (The Ministry of Disinvestment) in December 1999, the Department of Disinvestments came into existence in May 2004 when the ministry was turned into a department of the Ministry of Finance. The department took up all the functions of the erstwhile ministry which broadly was responsible for a systematic policy approach to disinvestment and privatisation of Public Sector Units (PSUs).

Tuhin Kanta Pandey is the current secretary of this department.

Department of Public Enterprises

Department of Public Enterprises which was earlier part of the Ministry of Heavy Industries and Public Enterprises will now be under Ministry of Finance. Finance Ministry will now have six departments while DPE's hereto parent ministry, the Ministry of Heavy Industries and Public Enterprises will now be called the Ministry of Heavy Industries. The shift of DPE to the Finance Ministry will help in efficient monitoring of the capital expenditure, asset monetisation and financial health of the Central Public Sector Undertakings  (CPSUs).

See also 
 National Institute of Public Finance and Policy
 Minister of Finance (India)
 Central Plan Scheme Monitoring System

References

External links
 Finance Ministry
 Official Facebook Page of Ministry of Finance, Govt. of India
 Income Tax department
 Central Board of Excise and Customs

 
Finance
Finance in India
India